Grave robbery is the act of uncovering a grave, tomb or crypt to steal commodities.

Grave Robber may refer to:

 Grave Robber (band), American horror punk band
 Graverobbers (film), 1988 American film
 Grave Robbers (film), 1989 Mexican film

See also 

 Grave Robbers from Outer Space,  a card game